Sir Roger de Mortimer, 2nd Earl of March, 4th Baron Mortimer of Wigmore, KG (11 November 132826 February 1360) was an English nobleman and military commander during the Hundred Years' War.

He was the son of Sir Edmund Mortimer (d. 1331) and Elizabeth de Badlesmere, and grandson of Roger Mortimer, 1st Earl of March.

Inheritance 
The Mortimer family lands and titles were lost after the first Earl of March's revolt and death by hanging in 1330, which was followed the next year by the death of Roger's father. Roger thus grew up with uncertain prospects, and re-acquired the family honours only gradually.

Around 1342, he received back Radnor, and the next year the old family baronial seat at Wigmore, Herefordshire.

Military career 
As a young man he distinguished himself in the wars in France, fighting at Crécy and elsewhere in the campaign of 1347. Afterwards, he was given livery of the rest of his lands, was one of the knights admitted at the foundation of the Order of the Garter, and was summoned to parliament as a baron both in 1348. 
He was knighted on 12 July 1346 at La Hogue by Edward the Black Prince.

Earldom 
In 1354, the sentence passed against Mortimer's treacherous grandfather, the first earl, was reversed, and the next year he was summoned to parliament as Earl of March. Also in 1355, he received a number of important appointments, including Constable of Dover Castle and Warden of the Cinque Ports, and he accompanied an expedition of Edward III to France.

Other honours 
On 19 October 1356, his grandmother Joan de Geneville, 2nd Baroness Geneville, widow of the first earl, died, and Roger inherited her vast estates, including Ludlow Castle, which was thereafter the Mortimer family seat and power base.

In the following years, he became a member of the Royal Council and was appointed Constable at the castles of Montgomery, Bridgnorth in Shropshire, and Corfe in Dorset.

In 1359, and continuing into 1360, he was Constable of Edward III's invasion of France. He fought in the failed siege of Reims and captured Auxerre. The English forces then moved into Burgundy, where Roger died suddenly at Rouvray, near Avallon.

Marriage and children 
Roger married Philippa de Montagu (1332–1381), daughter of William Montagu, 1st Earl of Salisbury, and Catherine Grandison and had by her at least four children:
 Roger Mortimer, who died young;
 Edmund Mortimer, 3rd Earl of March;
 Margery Mortimer.
 Janet Mortimer, who married Andrew Gray, father of Andrew Gray, 1st Lord Gray.
 
Mortimer also had at least one illegitimate child:
 Sir Thomas Mortimer, who acted as deputy for his nephew Roger Mortimer, 4th Earl of March, in Ireland (1382–1383) and stood trial for the slaying of Richard II's commander, Sir Thomas Molineux after the Battle of Radcot Bridge (1387).

Arms 
Heraldic Coat of Arms: Barry Or and azure, on a chief of the first three pallets between two gyronnies based on the second, over all an inescutcheon argent.

Ancestry

Footnotes

References

R. R. Davies, 'Mortimer, Roger (VI), second earl of March (1328–1360)’, Oxford Dictionary of National Biography, Oxford University Press, Sept 2004; online edn, Jan 2008.

Mortimer
Knights Bachelor
Garter Knights appointed by Edward III
1328 births
1360 deaths
Roger